Darya Dmytrivna Kravets (born 21 March 1994) is a Ukrainian professional footballer who plays for Serie A club FC Como Women and the Ukraine women's national team. She previously played in France for Reims, in Russia for Mordovochka Saransk, FC Zorky Krasnogorsk and in Kazakhstan for BIIK Kazygurt.

Biography

Career in club 
Darya started with another sport, road cycling, at the age of nine. While she continued to practice the discipline in competition, even winning a podium in a national championship, she finally chose football at the age of 14 and made her debut for Lehenda Chernihiv.
In 2014, she joined the women's team of the Russian club FC Mordovia Saransk. She played her first match in the Russian Premier League on April 13, 2014 against the club Ryazan-VDV.
The following year she joined FC Zorky Krasnogorsk and finished at the third position of the Russia championship.

In 2016 she joined the club BIIK Kazygurt in Kazakhstan. Darya participates in the Champions League with BIIK Kazygurt and in the 2018-2019 season faces and beats Barcelona 3-1 in the round of 16.

Darya Kravets joined France in the summer 2019 by signing at the Stade de Reims, for the club's return among the elite in D1 Féminine.

International career
She made her debut for the Ukraine national team WU-17 on October 21, 2010, in the winning (6-1) home game of the WU-17 European Championship first qualifying round against Kazakhstan. She made her debut for the Ukraine women's national team on September 13, 2014, in the winning World Cup (8-0) home qualifying match against Turkey.

International goals

Honours
 Ukrainian Women's Cup : 2012
 Ukrainian Women's League : runner-up 2012
 Russian Women's Football Championship : 3rd place 2015
 Kazakhstani Championship
 2016, 2017, 2018
 Kazakhstani Cup 
 2016, 2017, 2018

References

External links
 

1994 births
Living people
Footballers from Donetsk
Ukrainian women's footballers
Women's association football defenders
FC Zorky Krasnogorsk (women) players
BIIK Kazygurt players
Stade de Reims Féminines players
Division 1 Féminine players
Ukraine women's international footballers
Ukrainian expatriate women's footballers
Ukrainian expatriate sportspeople in Russia
Expatriate women's footballers in Russia
Ukrainian expatriate sportspeople in Kazakhstan
Expatriate women's footballers in Kazakhstan
Ukrainian expatriate sportspeople in Israel
Expatriate women's footballers in Israel
Ukrainian expatriate sportspeople in France
Expatriate women's footballers in France
Ukrainian expatriate sportspeople in Italy
Expatriate women's footballers in Italy
S.S.D. F.C. Como Women players